Anton Alexandrovich Basansky (born July 7, 1987, Palatka, Magadan Oblast) is a Russian political figure, deputy of the 8th State Duma convocation. His father, Alexander Basansky, is a multibillionaire and takes the fourth  place in the Forbes ranking of the hundred Russian civil servants with the highest incomes.

In Anton Basansky 2009 he graduated from the Saint Petersburg Mining University. In 2020 Basansky continued his education at the Russian Presidential Academy of National Economy and Public Administration. From 2015 to 2021, he was a deputy of the Magadan City Duma of the 6th and 7th convocations. In 2016 he was appointed the head of the regional branch of the Young Guard of United Russia. He left this post in 2020 to become a member of the Chamber of Young Legislators under the Federation Council of the Federal Assembly of the Russian Federation.  

Since September 2021, he has served as a deputy of the 8th State Duma convocation. He ran with the United Russia. On October 12, 2021, he was also appointed a Deputy Chairman of the State Duma Committee for the Development of the Russian Far East and the Far North.

References

1987 births
Living people
People from Magadan Oblast
United Russia politicians
21st-century Russian politicians
Eighth convocation members of the State Duma (Russian Federation)